Oncken is a surname. Notable people with the surname include:

 Arthur Oncken Lovejoy, a German-born American philosopher
 August Oncken (1844–1911), a German economist (German article)
 Hermann Oncken (1867–1945), a German historian
 Johann Gerhard Oncken (1800–1884), a pioneer German Baptist preacher
 Wilhelm Oncken (1835–1905), a German historian

See also 
 Onken (disambiguation)